The  Bhavnagar Terminus–Kakinada Port Express is an Express train belonging to South Central Railway zone that runs between  and  in India. It is currently being operated with  train numbers on a weekly basis. From 18th March, 2023, it runs with highly refubrished LHB coaches.

Coach composition

The train has standard LHB rakes with a max speed of 130 kmph. The train consists of 20 coaches:
 1 First AC coach
 3 AC II Tier
 7 AC III Tier
 3 AC III Tier economy
 2 Sleeper coaches
 2 General Unreserved
 2 Eog cum Luggage Rake

Service

17203/ Bhavnagar–Kakinada Port Express has an average speed of 50 km/hr and covers 2047 km in 40h 50m.
17204/ Kakinada Port–Bhavnagar Express has an average speed of 51 km/hr and covers 2047 km in 40h.

Route & Halts 

The important halts of the train are:

Schedule

Traction

Both trains are hauled by a Vijayawada-based WAP-7 or Lallaguda-based WAP-7 electric locomotive from  Bhavnagar Terminus to Kakinada Port and vice versa.

Rake sharing 

The train shares its rake with 17205/17206 Sainagar Shirdi–Kakinada Port Express.

See also 

 Bhavnagar Terminus railway station
 Kakinada Port railway station
 Sainagar Shirdi–Kakinada Port Express

Notes

References

External links 

 17203/Bhavnagar Terminus–Kakinada Port Express India Rail Info
 17204/Kakinada Port–Bhavnagar Terminus Express India Rail Info

Transport in Bhavnagar
Transport in Kakinada
Express trains in India
Rail transport in Gujarat
Rail transport in Karnataka
Rail transport in Maharashtra
Rail transport in Telangana
Rail transport in Andhra Pradesh
Railway services introduced in 2006